Riehl may refer to:

 Riehl, Cologne, a city part of Nippes, Cologne, Germany 
 Riehl (surname)
 16189 Riehl, a main-belt asteroid

See also 
 Riehl melanosis, a form of contact dermatitis
 Riel (disambiguation)